Hughes Basin is a large basinlike névé in the Britannia Range of Antarctica which is bounded except to the south by the Ravens Mountains, Mount Henderson, Mount Olympus and Mount Quackenbush. It was named after Terence J. Hughes of the Department of Geological Sciences and the Institute of Quaternary Studies at the University of Maine, Orono, who made an intensive study of the Byrd Glacier in 1978–79, entailing photogrammetric determination of the elevation of the ice surface and its velocity, radio-echo sounding from LC-130 aircraft, and ground survey from fixed stations close to Byrd Glacier and moving stations on the glacier itself.

References

Snow fields of Oates Land